Marilyn Janet Breen (born 1944) is a professor of mathematics at the University of Oklahoma. Her research involves geometry, including visibility and orthogonal polygons.

Life and work
Breen graduated in 1966 from Agnes Scott College, and received her Ph.D. from Clemson University in 1970 under the supervision of William Ray Hare Jr. She joined the Oklahoma faculty in 1971 and was promoted to full professor in 1982.

Awards and honors
In her time at the University of Oklahoma, Breen won several awards for teaching and research, including an "outstanding teacher" award.

In 2012, Breen became a fellow of the American Mathematical Society.

Selected publications

References

Living people
1944 births
Women mathematicians
Fellows of the American Mathematical Society
Agnes Scott College alumni
Clemson University alumni
University of Oklahoma faculty